WSF can refer to:

 Windows Script File
 Washington State Ferries
 World Science Festival
 World Social Forum
 World Squash Federation
 World Snooker Federation
 Workers Suffrage Federation, later Workers Socialist Federation
 Women's Sport Foundation, later Women's Sport and Fitness Foundation
 World Strongman Federation
 Wyższa Szkoła Filologiczna (Philological School of Higher Education), Wrocław, Poland